Gresse-en-Vercors is a commune in the Isère department in southeastern France.

Population

Twin towns
Gresse-en-Vercors is twinned with:

  Calvanico, Italy, since 2003

See also
Communes of the Isère department
Parc naturel régional du Vercors

References

External links

Official site

Communes of Isère
Isère communes articles needing translation from French Wikipedia